The Roman Catholic Diocese of Gaspé (erected 5 May 1922) is a suffragan of the Archdiocese of Rimouski in Quebec, Canada.

Ordinaries
François-Xavier Ross (1922 – 1945)
Albini LeBlanc (1945 – 1957)
Paul Bernier (1957 – 1964), Archbishop (personal title)   
Jean-Marie Fortier (1965 – 1968), appointed Archbishop of Sherbrooke, Québec
Joseph Gilles Napoléon Ouellet, P.M.E. (1968 – 1973)
Bertrand Blanchet (1973 – 1992), appointed Archbishop of Rimouski, Québec
Raymond Dumais (1993 – 2001)
Jean Gagnon (2002 – 2016)
Gaétan Proulx, O.S.M. (2016–)

Bibliography

See also
Catholic Church in Canada

References

External links and references
Diocese of Gaspé site

Gaspe
Christian organizations established in 1922
Roman Catholic dioceses and prelatures established in the 20th century